The 2014 Premier League was the second division of British speedway.

Summary
The season took place between March and October 2014. The Somerset Rebels were the defending champions after winning in 2013. This season saw a change to the line-up of teams, with the Peterborough Panthers dropping down from the Elite League and replacing the Leicester Lions who moved up to take Peterborough's place in the Elite League.

Final League table

Home: 3W = Home win by 7 points or more; 2W = Home win by between 1 and 6 points 
Away: 4W = Away win by 7 points or more; 3W = Away win by between 1 and 6 points; 1L = Away loss by 6 points or less
M = Meetings; D = Draws; L = Losses; F = Race points for; A = Race points against; +/- = Race points difference; Pts = Total Points

Play Offs
Group 1

Group 2

Play Off final
First leg

Second leg

Edinburgh were declared League Champions, winning on aggregate 96–95.

Premier League Knockout Cup
The 2014 Premier League Knockout Cup was the 47th edition of the Knockout Cup for tier two teams. Edinburgh Monarchs were the winners of the competition.

First round

Quarter-finals

Semi-finals

Final
First leg

Second leg

Edinburgh were declared Knockout Cup Champions, winning on aggregate 105–75.

Final Leading averages

Riders & final averages
Berwick

 8.11
 7.67
 7.24
 6.83
 6.64
 6.31
 4.94
 2.61

Edinburgh

 10.41
 9.12
 8.76
 8.67
 8.31
 5.44
 4.00

Glasgow

 7.31
 6.97
 6.53
 6.28
 5.64
 5.21
 5.20
 5.00
 2.53

Ipswich

 8.06
 8.00
 7.98
 6.84
 6.29
 6.14
 6.10

Newcastle

 9.34 
 8.59
 7.81 
 7.41 
 6.98
 6.59
 5.28
 4.90
 4.41
 4.39

Peterborough

 9.02 
 8.40
 8.00
 7.90
 7.17
 5.85
 4.71
 4.31
 4.06
 3.80
 3.14

Plymouth

 9.48 
 7.18
 6.81
 6.80
 6.41
 5.97
 5.84
 3.73
 1.53

Redcar

 9.31
 8.02
 7.23
 6.07
 5.99
 5.41
 3.03
 2.89

Rye House

 8.70
 7.10
 6.33
 5.81
 5.33
 5.32
 5.32
 4.25
 1.50

Scunthorpe

 7.85 
 7.54
 7.49
 7.14
 7.13
 6.71
 2.21

Sheffield

 9.70 
 6.28
 6.15
 5.96
 5.60
 5.54
 4.84
 4.28
 3.91

Somerset

 8.83 
 8.34 
 8.19
 7.74 
 7.55
 6.79
 5.93

Workington

 9.04
 7.88
 7.49
 6.79
 5.76
 5.54
 5.54
 4.58
 3.24

See also
List of United Kingdom Speedway League Champions
Knockout Cup (speedway)

References

Speedway Premier League
Premier
Speedway Premier League